Premier Health is a medical network of three hospitals and two major health centers in the Dayton region.

Premier Health, which employs 14,000 workers, is the second-largest employer in the Dayton region and ninth-largest employer in Ohio. They contribute about $2 billion a year in positive economic impact.

Hospitals included in the network are:
 Miami Valley Hospital - Dayton, Ohio, United States.
 Atrium Medical Center - Middletown, Ohio, United States.
 Upper Valley Medical Center - Troy, Ohio, United States.

Community outreach
In December 2017, Premier Health worked with the advertising firm DeVito/Verdi to create an educational radio, television and print ads targeting at-risk individuals, their loved ones, and opioid misusers. This campaign hopes to start the conversation to address the ongoing opioid addiction crisis in the Dayton area.

See also
 List of hospitals in Ohio

References

External links
 Premier Health Homepage

Companies based in Dayton, Ohio
Healthcare in Dayton, Ohio
Hospital networks in the United States
Medical and health organizations based in Ohio